Bahag is a loincloth that was commonly used by men throughout the pre-colonial Philippines. They were either made from barkcloth or from hand-woven textiles. Before the colonial period, bahag were a common garment for commoners and the serf class (the alipin caste). Bahag survives in some indigenous tribes of the Philippines today - most notably the Cordillerans in Northern Luzon.

Description
The specific way to wear it involves first pulling the long piece of cloth (usually around ) in between the legs and covering the genitals, with a longer back part. The back part is then twisted across the right leg and across the waist in an anti-clockwise direction. It goes under the flap of the front part and across the left leg. It is twisted back across the back loop above the buttocks. The result resembles two rectangles of cloth hanging in front of and behind the waist, with a loop around the legs resembling a belt. The design of the weave is often unique to the tribe of the person wearing the bahag. The colors of the bahag can also indicate social status among some Igorot groups, with commoners usually wearing bahag in plain white. Among pre-colonial Visayans, wearing a bahag as casual clothing was common, even among nobility, because it showed off tattoos that indicate rank and prestige.

Modern bahags have since found their way to the lowlands as table runners, serviettes, and other decor and fashion accoutrements. The native Tagalog word for "rainbow", bahaghari, literally means "loincloth of the king".

Gallery

See also
Tapis (Philippine clothing)

References 

 Scott, William Henry (1994). Barangay: Sixteenth Century Philippine Culture and Society. Quezon City: Ateneo de Manila University Press. .

External links

 A demonstration of how bahag is traditionally tied

Philippine clothing
History of Asian clothing